Frank Pietrangelo (born December 17, 1964) is a Canadian former professional ice hockey goaltender.

Born in Niagara Falls, Ontario, Pietrangelo started his National Hockey League career with the Pittsburgh Penguins in 1988, winning the Stanley Cup in 1991. He also played for the Hartford Whalers. He left the NHL after the 1994 season. He played several more years in the IHL with the Minnesota Moose, Italy with HC Bolzano and Asiago Hockey AS, Germany in the DEL with Kaufbeurer Adler, and England in the BISL with the Manchester Storm before retiring after the 2001 season. He was named the Sekonda Face to Watch while playing for Manchester in December 1998.

He is perhaps best known for his play during the 1991 Stanley Cup playoffs in place of injured Penguins' starting goaltender Tom Barrasso. In game six of the opening round against the New Jersey Devils, Pietrangelo helped the Penguins stave off elimination with one of the most significant stops in Stanley Cup history, a glove save against Peter Stastny, who was shooting at a mostly-open net at point-blank range. The play, which would become known simply as "The Save," helped the Penguins win the game and keep them alive in the series. He then shut the Devils out in game 7 to allow the team to advance  to the next round, Barrasso to heal, and the Penguins to go on to win their first Stanley Cup beating the Minnesota North Stars.

Pietrangelo is cousin once-removed to NHL defenseman Alex Pietrangelo.

Frank Pietrangelo played for the University of Minnesota between 1982 and 1986.

References

External links 

1964 births
Bolzano HC players
Canadian ice hockey goaltenders
Hartford Whalers players
Asiago Hockey 1935 players
Ice hockey people from Ontario
Kaufbeurer Adler players
Living people
Manchester Storm (1995–2002) players
Minnesota Golden Gophers men's ice hockey players
Minnesota Moose players
Muskegon Lumberjacks players
Pittsburgh Penguins players
Pittsburgh Penguins draft picks
Sportspeople from Niagara Falls, Ontario
Springfield Indians players
Stanley Cup champions
Canadian expatriate ice hockey players in England
Canadian expatriate ice hockey players in Italy
Canadian expatriate ice hockey players in Germany